Geneviève Lacambre (born 1937) is a French honorary general curator of heritage, and has been the Chargée de mission at the Musée d'Orsay.

Career 
Curator at the department of paintings of the Louvre Museum from 1965 to 1979, then at the Musée d'Orsay until 2002. Lacambre has been for seventeen years director of the Musée national Gustave Moreau in Paris, from 1985 to 2002, a specialist of this Symbolist painter. She has published numerous articles and exhibition catalogues on Gustave Moreau and the Symbolists. She authored  (1997) and organised the 1998 exhibition of Moreau at the Grand Palais in Paris before being presented in Chicago and New York. In addition to Symbolism, she also curated an exhibition in 2017 where Japonisme is the theme.

It is outside the modes of his time that Gustave Moreau, trained in Renaissance art traditions, elaborated a complex and decorative art style, which combines a deep knowledge of all mythologies with a high awareness of a painter's profession. Creator of a highly personal universe, where there is a passion for myths and mysticism—Salome, Orpheus, Oedipus and the Sphinx ...—dream and imagination, poetry and mystery.

Moreau was at the same time one of the forerunners of Symbolism and one of those who opened the way for modern art: he was teacher of Henri Matisse and Georges Rouault, and was fascinating to the later Surrealists who drunk on dreams. The Gustave Moreau Museum—created by the artist himself—contains all the secrets of this "master enchanter", who was happy to call himself an "assembler of dreams".

Geneviève Lacambre retraces Moreau's life and artistic sources in this small colourful volume—entitled  (lit. 'Gustave Moreau: Master Enchanter'; English edition – Gustave Moreau: Magic and Symbols)—with more than 120 paintings, drawings, watercolours and photographs, and an anthology of documents and letters, published by Éditions Gallimard. It is part of the  series in their  collection. The book opens with seven full-page reproductions of Moreau's Jupiter and Semele and its details. The body text is divided into five chapters: I, "Uncertain Beginnings"; II, "In the School of Italy"; III, "A Hope for History Painting"; IV, "The Birth of Symbolism"; V, "A Message to Future Generations". The second part of this book is the "Documents" section containing a compilation of excerpts which is divided into five parts: 1, Moreau's writings; 2, Moreau's myths; 3, Novels and poems; 4, Critical perspectives; 5, A benevolent equal. At the end of the book are list of further reading, list of illustrations, and an index. It has been translated into American English and Japanese.

Selected publications 
 with Michel Laclotte and Claire Frèches-Thory, Orsay: Paintings, Editions Scala, 1989
 Gustave Moreau : Maître sorcier, coll. « Découvertes Gallimard » (nº 312), série Arts. Éditions Gallimard, 1997
 Gustave Moreau: Magic and Symbols, "Abrams Discoveries" series. Harry N. Abrams, 1999
 with Marie-Laure de Contenson, Douglas W. Druick, et al. Gustave Moreau: Between Epic and Dream, Art Institute of Chicago, 1999
 with Gary Tinterow, Deborah L. Roldán, et al. Manet/Velázquez: The French Taste for Spanish Painting, Metropolitan Museum of Art & Yale University Press, 2002

References 

1937 births
French curators
French women curators
Directors of museums in France
Women museum directors
Living people